Janine M. Benyus (born 1958) is an American natural sciences writer, innovation consultant, and author. After writing books on wildlife and animal behavior, she coined the term Biomimicry to describe intentional problem-solving design inspired by nature. Her book Biomimicry (1997) attracted widespread attention from businesspeople in  design, architecture, and engineering as well as from scientists.  Benyus argues that by following biomimetic approaches, designers can develop products that will perform better, be less expansive, use less energy, and leave companies less open to legal risk.

Life
Born in New Jersey, Benyus graduated summa cum laude from Rutgers University with degrees in natural resource management and English literature/writing. Benyus has taught interpretive writing and lectured at the University of Montana, and worked towards restoring and protecting wild lands. She serves on a number of land use committees in her rural county, and is president of Living Education, a nonprofit dedicated to place-based living and learning. Benyus lives in Stevensville, Montana.

Biomimicry
Benyus has written a number of books on animals and their behavior, but is best known for Biomimicry: Innovation Inspired by Nature (1997). In this book she develops the basic thesis that human beings should consciously emulate nature's genius in their designs. She encourages people to ask  "What would Nature do?" and to look at natural forms, processes, and ecosystems in nature to see what works and what lasts. 

Benyus articulates an approach that strongly emphasizes sustainability within biomimicry practice. sometimes referred to as Conditions Conducive to Life (CCL).
Benyus has described the development of sustainable solutions in terms of "Life’s Principles", emphasizing that organisms in nature have evolved methods of working that are not destructive of themselves and their environment.  “Nature runs on sunlight, uses only the energy it needs, fits form to function, recycles everything, rewards cooperation, banks on diversity, demands local expertise, curbs excess from within and taps the power of limits”.

In 1998, Benyus and  Dayna Baumeister co-founded the Biomimicry Guild as an innovation consultancy. Their goal was to help innovators learn from and emulate natural models in order to design sustainable products, processes, and policies that create conditions conducive to life.

In 2006, Benyus co-founded  The Biomimicry Institute with Dayna Baumeister and Bryony Schwan. Benyus is President of the non-profit organization, whose mission is to naturalize biomimicry in the culture by promoting the transfer of ideas, designs, and strategies from biology to sustainable human systems design.
In 2008 the Biomimicry Institute launched AskNature.org,  "an encyclopedia of nature's solutions to common design problems". The Biomimicry Institute has become a key communicator in the field of biomimetics, connecting 12,576 member practitioners and organizations in 36 regional networks and 21 countries through its  Biomimicry Global Network as of 2020.

In 2010, Benyus, Dayna Baumeister, Bryony Schwan, and Chris Allen formed Biomimicry 3.8, connecting their for-profit and nonprofit work by creating a benefit corporation. Biomimicry 3.8, which achieved B-corp certification,  
offers consultancy, professional training, development for educators, and "inspirational speaking".  Among its more than 250 clients are Nike, Kohler. Seventh Generation and C40 Cities.  By 2013, over 100 universities had joined the Biomimicry Educator’s Network, offering training in biomimetics. In 2014, the profit and non-profit aspects again became separate entities, with Biomimicry 3.8 engaging in for-profit consultancy and the Biomimicry Institute as a non-profit organization.

Benyus has served on various boards, including the Board of Directors for the U.S. Green Building Council and the advisory boards of the Ray C. Anderson Foundation and Project Drawdown. Benyus is an affiliate faculty member in The Biomimicry Center at Arizona State University.

Beynus' work has been used as the basis for films including the two-part film Biomimicry: Learning from Nature (2002), directed by Paul Lang and David Springbett for CBC's The Nature of Things and presented by David Suzuki.
She was one of the experts in the film Dirt! The Movie (2009) which was voiced by Jamie Lee Curtis.

Authored works
  Illustrated by Juan Carlos Barberis.
 
  Illustrated by Juan Carlos Barberis.

Awards and honors
 2019. Fellow, American Society of Interior Designers (ASID)
 2015, Edward O. Wilson Biodiversity Technology Pioneer Award
 2013, Gothenburg Award for Sustainable Development
 2012, Design Mind Award. Smithsonian’s Cooper-Hewitt National Design Museum
  2011, Heinz Award. with special focus on the environment 
 2009, Champion of the Earth for Science and Technology, United Nations Environment Programme.
 2007, Hero of the Environment, Time International
 2006, Women of Discovery Award, WINGS WorldQuest
 2004, Rachel Carson Lecture on Environmental Ethics
 2003, Lud Browman Award for Science Writing, Friends of the Mansfield Library, University of Montana

See also
Biomimicry

References

External links
 AskNature.org
 Biomimicry Toolbox
 

1958 births
Living people
Rutgers University alumni
University of Montana faculty
Sustainability advocates
People from Stevensville, Montana
National Design Award winners
American nature writers
Biomimetics